Luo Hongjiang (born May 1962) is a Chinese politician of Dai ethnicity currently serving as vice chairman of Yunnan Provincial People's Congress. Previously he served as governor of Xishuangbanna Dai Autonomous Prefecture.

He was a delegate to the 12th and 13th National People's Congress. He was an alternate member of the 19th Central Committee of the Chinese Communist Party.

Biography
Luo was born in Jinghong County (now Jinghong), Yunnan, in May 1962. After resuming the college entrance examination, in 1978, he was accepted to Yunnan Minzu University, majoring in Chinese language and literature. After graduating in 1982, he was assigned to Xishuangbanna Dai Autonomous Prefectural Radio as an editor and journalist, and served until November 1987, when he was promoted to vice president of Xishuangbanna Dai Autonomous Prefectural TV Station. 

Luo joined the Chinese Communist Party (CCP) in August 1988. In February 1995, he became deputy director of Xishuangbanna Dai Autonomous Prefectural Radio and Television Bureau, rising to director in July 1996. He was appointed party secretary of Mengla County in January 2001 and three years later was admitted to member of the Standing Committee of the CCP Xishuangbanna Dai Autonomous Prefectural Committee, the prefecture's top authority. He was transferred to the capital city Jinghong as party secretary in February 2004. He was executive vice governor of Xishuangbanna Dai Autonomous Prefecture in April 2008 and subsequently deputy party secretary in December 2011. In February 2013, he was named acting governor, confirmed in the following month. In January 2021, he was promoted again to become vice chairman of Yunnan Provincial People's Congress.

References

1962 births
Living people
Dai people
People from Jinghong
Yunnan Minzu University alumni
Governors of Xishuangbanna Dai Autonomous Prefecture
People's Republic of China politicians from Yunnan
Chinese Communist Party politicians from Yunnan
Alternate members of the 19th Central Committee of the Chinese Communist Party
Delegates to the 12th National People's Congress
Delegates to the 13th National People's Congress